Julio César García Mezones (born 16 June 1981 in Piura) is a Peruvian footballer who plays as a midfielder.

Club career
García started his senior career paying for Juan Aurich, and  there he made his Torneo Descentralizado debut in the 1999 season. In his first season in the top-flight he played in 6 matches for the Ciclón.

The following season, he played for Alianza Lima. However, he only managed to make 7 appearances in the 2000 Descentralizado season.

In July 2009 García returned to Cienciano after his time abroad.

References

1981 births
Living people
People from Piura
Association football midfielders
Peruvian footballers
Peru international footballers
Peruvian Primera División players
Cypriot First Division players
Juan Aurich footballers
Club Alianza Lima footballers
Unión Minas footballers
Cienciano footballers
Atlético Morelia players
AEL Limassol players
Enosis Neon Paralimni FC players
Peruvian expatriate footballers
Expatriate footballers in Mexico
Expatriate footballers in Cyprus